Rajlukshmee Debee Bhattacharya is an Indian poet, translator and literary critic writing in Bengali and English. She won First Prize at the All India Poetry Competition in 1991 organized by The Poetry Society (India) in collaboration with the British Council.

Biography

Rajlukshmee Debee Bhattacharya was born in 1927. She taught at the Indian Institute of Technology, Kharagpur and Fergusson College,  Pune. She was also a Professor of Philosophy at Nowrosjee Wadia College.

She is the author of The Owl and Other Poems and The Touch Me Not Girl.  Her translation works are unique works of transcreation, and her translations include the songs of Rabindranath Tagore.

Rajlukshmee Debee was All India Poetry Prize winner in 1991 for her poem Punarnava (‘’The Ever Renewing’’). Rajlukshmee was also on the Jury for the first ever All India Poetry Competition for School Children held in 1996.

Selected works

Books
 ‘’The Owl and Other Poems’’, Writers Workshop, Kolkata India 1972
 ’’The Touch Me Not Girl’’, Disha Publishers, New Delhi India 2000. 
 ’’28 Songs of Rabindranath Tagore’’,  Writers Workshop , Kolkata India 2002.

Articles
 Personal Man and Personal God ‘’International Philosophical Quarterly’’ Volume-15, December 1975.
 Because He is a Man ‘’Cambridge Journal’’ Volume 49, Issue 175, January 1974.
 ‘’The Waste Land of Bengali Fiction’’, “Indian Writing Today”, Volume-3, Number-3, July–September 1969

See also

 Indian English Literature
 Indian Writing in English
 Indian poetry
 The Poetry Society (India)

References

Sources
 “Ghosts”, The Little Magazine, ‘’Rules of Love’’ 
 Contemporary Indian English Poetry – Challenges and Response
 Nations of the Soul and Female Poetic Activism – Rajlukshmee Debee’s ‘’Punarnava’’

External links
  ‘’Indian Poetry – Modernism and After’’ :- Rajlukshmee Debee Bhattacharya

20th-century Indian translators
Indian women translators
English-language poets from India
Indian literary critics
20th-century Indian women writers
Living people
20th-century Indian poets
Women writers from West Bengal
Indian women critics
Indian women poets
20th-century Bengali poets
Bengali-language poets
Bengali writers
Bengali-language writers
Bengali female poets
Women critics
1927 births
Bengali Hindus
20th-century Bengalis
All India Poetry Prize
University of Calcutta alumni
Academic staff of IIT Kharagpur